William Whittlesey (or Whittlesea) (died 5 June 1374) was a Bishop of Rochester, then Bishop of Worcester, then finally Archbishop of Canterbury. He also served as Master of Peterhouse, Cambridge.

Life

Whittlesey was probably born in the Cambridgeshire village of Whittlesey, England.

Whittlesey was educated at Oxford, and owing principally to the fact that he was a nephew of Simon Islip, archbishop of Canterbury, he received numerous ecclesiastical preferments; he held prebends at Lichfield, Chichester and Lincoln, and livings at Ivychurch, Croydon and Cliffe.

Whittlesey was briefly appointed Master of Peterhouse on 10 September 1349 and resigned from that post in 1351. Later he was appointed vicar-general, and then dean of the court of arches by Islip. On 23 October 1360 he became Bishop of Rochester and was consecrated on 6 February 1362. Two years after his consecration he was transferred to the bishopric of Worcester on 6 March 1364. On 11 October 1368 Whittlesey was transferred to the archbishopric of Canterbury in succession to Simon Langham, but his term of office was very uneventful, a circumstance due partly, but not wholly, to his feeble health. He died at Lambeth on the 5th or 6 June 1374.

Notes

References
 
 
 
 
 

1374 deaths
People from Whittlesey
Archbishops of Canterbury
Bishops of Rochester
Bishops of Worcester
14th-century English Roman Catholic archbishops
Masters of Peterhouse, Cambridge
Burials at Canterbury Cathedral
Year of birth unknown